Yuliya Kalinovskaya (born 27 February 1983) is a Russian rower. She competed at the 2004 Summer Olympics and the 2008 Summer Olympics.

References

External links
 

1983 births
Living people
Russian female rowers
Olympic rowers of Russia
Rowers at the 2004 Summer Olympics
Rowers at the 2008 Summer Olympics
Sportspeople from Astrakhan